The 2002 Maryland Terrapins football team represented the University of Maryland in the 2002 NCAA Division I-A football season. Led by head coach Ralph Friedgen, the Terrapins appeared in the 2002 Peach Bowl.

Schedule

Roster

Team players in the NFL
The following players were selected in the 2003 NFL Draft.

Awards and honors
E.J. Henderon, Atlantic Coast Conference Defensive Player of the Year
E.J. Henderson, Chuck Bednarik Award
E.J. Henderson, Butkus Award

References

Maryland
Maryland Terrapins football seasons
Peach Bowl champion seasons
Maryland Terrapins football